SOS Hermann Gmeiner College  located in Mirpur-13 of the capital Dhaka city of Bangladesh is nation's one of the best institutions for primary and secondary education. It was established in 1986 by the SOS-Kinderdorf International, headquartered in Innsbruck, Austria, a non-government organization. The foundation stone was laid by former President of Bangladesh, Hussain Muhammad Ershad. In 2010, the college was ranked among the top ten best institutions of the country for its academic performance in Secondary School Certificate examination.

Primarily established to educate the children who reside in the SOS Children Village of Dhaka, the school now takes students from all social backgrounds in grades from preparatory to twelfth grade aged from  4 to 18. The Bangladesh chapter of SOS-Kinderdorf International SOS Children's Village International in Bangladesh headed by a National Director is the administrative body of the institution with the Principal serving as the head of the institution.
The school has approximately 1200 students on role.

History

Background
Bangladesh emerged as a sovereign country on March 26 of 1971 and won its freedom from Pakistan on December 16 of the same year. Due to the nine-month-long war in 1971, Bangladesh slipped into a humanitarian crisis that was beyond description. During the critical time of the nation, the Austrian philanthropist Dr. Hermann Gmeiner came forward with his hands of assistance in 1972.

Professor Hermann made a proposal to Bangabandhu Sheikh Mujibur Rahman to establish a Children village for the orphans of the newly independent nation. Bangabandhu agreed to the proposal that paved the way for the establishment of the Children's village and subsequently the college.

On behalf of the government of Bangladesh, the then Ministry of Labour and Social Welfare signed an agreement with the organization on May 17, 1972, to start SOS Children's Village activities in Bangladesh.

Establishment
The plan to build up a college was primarily with the objective to provide education to the orphans of the village along with the deprived section of the society. A two-acre land area was selected for the college.

The college which is a two-story vaulted brick structure includes 20 classrooms, three laboratories, a multi-purpose hall, a gymnasium, a library, and dining facilities. The college was designed by Nahas Ahmed Khalil and Raziul Ahsan. With a playground and a basketball ground the school is known for its architectural beauty.
The school officially started its academic program on January 19 of 1986.

Academic programme
SOS Hermann Gmeiner College offers education for students from preparatory to twelfth grade. There are two sections in every class, not typically named with letters or number, rather with names of flowers, planets or animals.

The college was ranked ninth among all the institutions in 2010 on the result of SSC examinations. In HSC it was ranked the 15th among all the colleges of the country.

Extra-curricular activities
Students of the institution are encouraged to join science-based Olympiads, general knowledge competitions, debating, singing, dancing and other sporting activities.

SOS Hermann Gmeiner College founded Hermann Gmeiner Science Club and Hermann Gmeiner Debating Club in 2004 to facilitate science-based activities and flourish the concept of debating in the arena. In addition, mathematics club, language club and cultural club were established in 2009 to engage the students with such activities.

Hermann Gmeiner Science Club is among the prominent science clubs of the country with their excellence in national level general knowledge competitions and Olympiads.

The institution got one of the best spellers of the country who was ranked among the top twenty spellers of Bangladesh. Students from the organization have shown their excellence in national level cultural competitions as well as regional.

Uniform
All students have to wear college uniform as designed and directed by the college authority. There are two different uniforms for two seasons: summer (April–September) and winter (October–March). There is a special dress for sports day (once a week).

The uniforms consist the following:

House
The institution has two houses: Hawks and Eagles. Each year, after the annual sports competition, the most achiever house is declared the best of the year.

References

External links 
 soshgcdhaka.edu.bd/ - Official website, HGC.

Colleges in Dhaka District
1986 establishments in Bangladesh